Lubicz Dolny  is a village in the administrative district of Gmina Lubicz, within Toruń County, Kuyavian-Pomeranian Voivodeship, in north-central Poland.

The village has a population of 1,900.

References

Lubicz Dolny